Amruta Fadnavis (nee Ranade; born 9 April 1979) is an Indian banker, actor, singer and social activist. She is married to the 9th and current Deputy Chief Minister of Maharashtra, Devendra Fadnavis. She holds the post of vice-president with Axis Bank.

She has represented India at National Prayer Breakfast – 2017, an International peace initiative presided by U.S. President Donald Trump.

Early life
Amruta Fadnavis was born as Amruta Ranade on 9 April 1979 in Nagpur, Maharashtra to Sharad Ranade, an ophthalmologist and Charulata Ranade, a gynaecologist. She initially studied at St. Joseph Convent School, Nagpur. She was a state level under 16 tennis player. She graduated from G.S. College of Commerce and Economics, Nagpur. Later she pursued MBA in finance and studied taxation laws from Symbiosis Law School, Pune.

Fadnavis started her career with Axis Bank as executive cashier in 2003 and subsequently headed Axis Bank business branch in Nagpur.

Personal life

Amruta married Devendra Fadnavis in December 2005. They have one daughter.

Career

As a banker 
As a banker, Fadnavis has worked with Axis Bank since the last 17 years. She joined as an executive cashier and works as Vice-president – Transaction Banking Department. She migrated to the corporate office at Worli, Mumbai in January 2015 and continued working with Axis Bank even after her husband became the Chief Minister of Maharashtra.

As a singer 

Trained since the age of six in classical music, Fadnavis has performed at various social events as well as has sung for many commercial and social films. She made her debut as a playback singer in Prakash Jha’s Jai Gangaajal with the song titled "Sab Dhan Mati". She sang a song in a biopic Sangharsh Yatra based on the life of BJP leader Gopinath Munde.

Fadnavis' first music video "Phir Se" featuring Amitabh Bachchan released by T-Series was viewed over 700,000 times in a single day and reached over 1.4 million views in three days.

In 2018, her song "Mumbai River Anthem" was to save the four rivers of Mumbai-Poisar, Dahisar, Oshiwara and Mithi. In 2020, she sang "Alag Mera Ye Rang Hai" for acid attack victims, "Tu Mandir Tu Shivala" for the corona warriors and "Tila Jagu Dya" for women's empowerment.

On the occasion of Mahashivratri in 2022, Fadnavis launched a new song, a rendition of the Sanskrit hymn Shiva Tandava Stotra. Released by Times Music, it received over 12 million views on YouTube .

As a social activist 
In 2017, Fadnavis organised a fashion show of acid attack survivors, dubbed the "Acid Attack Victors", at National Sports Club of India, Worli. The show was supported by Divyaj Foundation in collaboration with Maharashtra State Women Commission. Chief Minister of Maharashtra Devendra Fadnavis, who was present at the event, announced an increase of the compensation amount for acid attack victims from 300,000 to 500,000.

In 2019, Fadanvis and the Divyaj Foundation initiated a musical talent show titled Mitti Ke Sitare for underprivileged school children between the ages of 7 to 15 from the slums of Mumbai, with an aim to provide selected candidates in different genre of vocal and instrumental music a larger platform.

Other activities
Amruta Fadnavis led the delegation to Manasarovar to promote Indo-Chinese peace in 2015.

Maharashtra State Lawn Tennis Association (MSLTA) announced Fadnavis as the Chief Patron of the Davis Cup tie between India and New Zealand 2017 in Pune. She was again announced as the chief patron of the L&T Mumbai Open Tennis Tournament which took place in November 2018.

A documentary about Fadnavis, The Voice won the Best Film Documentary at IndieFEST, in 2019. It was written, directed, and produced by Sagar Pagar.

Controversies
In October 2018, Amruta Fadnavis attended the inaugural voyage of India's first luxury cruise liner 'Angriya'. Fadnavis was criticised after a video of her sitting on the edge of the vessel risking her life to take a selfie was released online. Fadnavis purportedly ignored multiple requests from security personnel to return to the safe areas of the vessel. She later issued an apology for setting a bad example for the youth by taking undue risks to take a selfie.

In September 2019, Fadnavis was in a controversy for calling Prime Minister Narendra Modi, the "Father of our Country" while wishing the latter on his birthday.

Awards
 Women's Excellence Awards 2017.
 The Woman of Substance Award at I Am Woman awards 2017.
 Award for Excellence – 2017 for Excellence in Women Empowerment by All Ladies League and Divine Vibrations.
 Suryadatta National Award-2016 for excellence in the field of Banking & Finance.
 Woman of the Year – 2015 awarded by Army, Airforce, Navy (AAN foundation) towards – service to Woman's Dignity & Equality in society.
 Lokmat Most Stylish Icon – Power Woman Award 2016
 JITO (Jain International Trade Organisation) power woman award
 Honored with Nelson Mandela Humanitarian Award & Certificate of Recognition.

References

Living people
Singers from Mumbai
Marathi people
Bollywood playback singers
Indian women playback singers
Musicians from Nagpur
Women musicians from Maharashtra
Indian women bankers
20th-century Indian women classical singers
Businesspeople from Mumbai
Businesswomen from Maharashtra
1979 births
21st-century Indian women classical singers
Spouses of Indian politicians